The Sony α7, α7R, α7S and α7C (the α is sometimes spelled out as Alpha) are four closely related families of full-frame mirrorless interchangeable-lens cameras. The first two were announced in October 2013, the third in April 2014 and the fourth in September 2020. They are Sony's first full-frame mirrorless interchangeable lens cameras and share the E-mount with the company's smaller sensor NEX series.

The α7 II was announced in November 2014, and is the first in the family to revise the original body and ergonomics. The α7C introduced an even more compact form factor, being the smallest full-frame camera with in-body image stabilization. The α7 series is targeted at experienced users, enthusiasts and professionals.

The Sony α7 and α7R have the model numbers ILCE-7 and ILCE-7R respectively. In addition, the α7S, the α7 II, and the α7R II have the model numbers ILCE-7S, ILCE-7M2, and ILCE-7RM2. Sony's new model naming prefix strives to unify model names. "ILC" stands for Interchangeable Lens Camera, followed by an indicator of A-mount "A" or E-mount "E".

Pre-announcement rumours speculated that the new camera would be named "Sony NEX-9".

Variations 

In 2014/2015, three new models became available forming the second generation of α7 series. They are the α7 II (ILCE-7M2), α7R II (ILCE-7RM2) and α7S II (ILCE-7SM2).
Sony continues to produce the first generation models α7 and α7S, even three years after the launch, only the α7 has been discontinued in April 2019.

The basic α7 II model has 24 MP and has manual focus and hybrid autofocus

The second generation common ground is the newer and improved body design as well as the world's first five-axis sensor-shift image stabilization system for a full-frame ILC. Sony claims that this can compensate a 4.5-stop equivalent of camera shake. In-body stabilization requires no special lens features, and mirrorless system cameras can typically accommodate lenses from any SLR system. As an upgrade of the α7, the α7 II has the same 50 Mbit XAVC-S codec as the α7S but lacks 4K video, and the five-axis stabilization is less effective in video mode than that used in the Olympus OM-D E-M1. However, the crop mode used in the α7 II does not incur "very much loss in image quality", unlike that of the Nikon D750.

On 14 June 2015, Hasselblad announced the Lusso, a variant of the Sony α7R marketed by Hasselblad.

The third generation started in 2017, and the fourth was announced in July 2019.

Model differences

Features (universal for α7-series)
 Exmor CMOS full-frame sensor (with different megapixels depending on camera version)
 TruBlack XtraFine LCD screen (3 inch/7.5 cm) with tilt functionality
 1.3 cm (0.5 inch) electronic viewfinder
 1200-zone evaluative light metering
 Built-in Wi-Fi and NFC
 LED-auto focus illuminator
 Multi Interface Shoe (α7R IV adds digital audio interface)
 9+1 customizable buttons (10+1 starting with second generation) / 45+ assignable functions

Reception
The cameras received a positive reception from critics. DxOMark crowned the α7R as the highest ranking full-frame mirrorless camera, with a score of 95 (the same score as the Nikon D800, but one point behind the Nikon D800E). The α7 achieved a score of 90, higher than the Nikon Df and Nikon D4 professional DSLR cameras, as well as the Sony SLT-A99. The Verge rated the cameras 8.3 out of 10, commenting that "It might be a few years before we realize it, but when the DSLR is relegated to a niche status among specialty photographers and full-frame mirrorless cameras dominate the market, we'll have the α7's to thank as the cameras that started it all." EPhotozine which rated the α7 5 stars, meanwhile praised the α7 series' price point for making them "the cheapest full-frame digital cameras currently available" while being lighter and smaller than comparable cameras. It awarded the α7 "Camera of the Year." The α7R was awarded by Imaging Resource as the "Camera of the Year".

See also
List of Sony E-mount cameras
Sony α7II
Sony α6000

References

External links

α7
Cameras introduced in 2013
Full-frame mirrorless interchangeable lens cameras